Gama Rural LLG is a local-level government (LLG) of Madang Province, Papua New Guinea.

Wards
35. Aingdai /Forogo
36. Ambisiba
37. Kenaint
38. Kinibong
39. Gai
40. Bank
41. Useruk
43. Kwaringiri
44. Garisakan / Umerum
45. Gunts
46. Komaraga
47. Kombaku
48. Nimbla

References

Local-level governments of Madang Province